The escudo was either of two distinct Spanish currency denominations.

Gold escudo

The first escudo was a gold coin introduced in 1535/1537, with coins denominated in escudos issued until 1833. It was initially worth 16 reales. When different reales were introduced, the escudo became worth 16 reales de plata in 1642, then 16 reales de plata fuerte or 40 reales de vellón from 1737.

Coins
Between 1809 and 1849, coins denominated as 80, 160 and 320 reales (de vellon) were issued, equivalent, in gold content and value, to the 2, 4 and 8 escudo coins.
Most were minted in Madrid, marked with a superscripted M or in Seville bearing an S below and left of the Royal Coat of Arms. The mintmaster's initials appeared on the opposite side.

Silver escudo
The second escudo was the currency of Spain between 1864 and 1869. It was subdivided into 100 céntimos de escudo. The escudo replaced the real at a rate of 10 reales = 1 escudo. It was itself replaced by the peseta, at a rate of  pesetas = 1 escudo, when Spain joined the Latin Monetary Union. The later silver escudo was worth one quarter of the earlier, gold escudo.

Coins
The 1 escudo was introduced in 1864, followed by the other silver and gold coins in 1865 and the copper coins in 1866. All the coins were minted until 1868, with 10 escudos also minted in 1873 during the First Republic.

See also

 Portuguese escudo

References

External links
The Colonial Coinage of Spanish America: An introduction by Daniel Frank Sedwick

Silver escudo
Coins of Spain